Dennis George Shaw (16 February 1931 – 5 April 2017) was an English cricketer.  Shaw was a right-handed batsman who bowled leg break googly.  He was born at Salford, Lancashire.

Shaw made a single first-class appearance for Warwickshire against the Combined Services in 1949 at Edgbaston.  Warwickshire won the toss and elected to bat, making 368/9 declared in their first-innings, with Shaw making 17 runs before he was dismissed by Robert Wilson.  The Combined Services responded in their first-innings with 284 all out, with Shaw taking the wickets of Bill Greensmith and John Deighton to finish the innings with figures of 2/60 from 20 overs.  In their second-innings, Shaw wasn't required to bat, with Warwickshire declaring their innings on 216/5.  The Combined Services narrowly avoided defeat, reaching 192/9 in their second-innings, before the match was declared a draw.  Shaw bowled 14 wicketless overs for the cost of 46 runs in the innings.  This was his only major appearance for Warwickshire.

He died on 5 April 2017, aged 86.

References

External links
Dennis Shaw at ESPNcricinfo
Dennis Shaw at CricketArchive

1931 births
2017 deaths
Cricketers from Salford
English cricketers
Warwickshire cricketers